Plestiodon multivirgatus, commonly known as the many-lined skink, the northern many-lined skink, or the variable skink, is a medium-sized species of lizard, a member of the North American skink genus Plestiodon in the family Scincidae.

Taxonomy
The taxonomy of this species is somewhat unclear, even amongst researchers. Most commonly, two subspecies are recognized:
P. m. multivirgatus (Hallowell, 1857) – northern many-lined skink
P. m. epipleurotus (Cope, 1880) – variable skink

The latter is sometimes treated as a separate species Plestiodon epipleurotus or Plestiodon gaigeae (Taylor, 1935), or given as the subspecies P. m. gaigeae. These last two scientific names are in honor of American herpetologist Helen Beulah Thompson Gaige (1890–1976) of the University of Michigan.

P. m. epipleurotus is also called the two-lined skink.

Description
Its body is olive to brown in color. P. m. multivirgatus has black stripes along the body and tail, while P. m. epipleurotus has two white stripes with black borders.

Geographic range & habitat
The geographic range of P. m. multivirgatus is limited in the north by southern South Dakota, Nebraska, and Wyoming and extends in the south to the Arkansas River in Colorado. P. m. multivirgatus prefers sandy soil and occurs in habitat below .

P. m. epipleurotus occurs from south-eastern Utah and southern Colorado through Arizona, New Mexico, and western Texas to Chihuahua in Mexico.

References

Further reading
Behler JL, King FW (1979). The Audubon Society Field Guide to North American Reptiles and Amphibians. New York: Alfred A. Knopf, Inc. 743 pp. . (Eumeces multivirgatus, p. 574 + Plate 422).
Conant R (1975). A Field Guide to Reptiles and Amphibians of Eastern and Central North America, Second Edition. Boston: Houghton Mifflin Company. xviii + 429 pp. + Plates 1-48.  (hardcover),  (paperback). (Eumeces multivirgatus, pp. 128–129 + Plate 19 + Map 78).
Hallowell E (1857). "Description of several new North American Reptiles". Proc. Acad. Nat. Sci. Philadelphia 9: 215-216. ("Plestiodon multivirgatum [sic]", new species, p. 215).
Powell R Conant R, Collins JT (2016). Peterson Field Guide to Reptiles and Amphibians of Eastern and Central North America, Fourth Edition. Boston and New York: Houghton Mifflin Harcourt. xiv + 494 pp., 47 plates, 207  figures. . (Plestiodon multivirgatus, p. 310 + Plate 29).
Smith HM, Brodie ED Jr (1982). Reptiles of North America: A Guide to Field Identification. New York: Golden Press. 240 pp. . (Eumeces multivirgatus, pp. 78–79).
Stebbins RC (2003). A Field Guide to Western Reptiles and Amphibians, Third Edition. The Peterson Field Guide Series ®. Boston and New York: Houghton Mifflin Company. xiii + 533 pp. . (Eumeces multivirgatus, pp. 311–312 + Plate 36 + Map 111).

External links
BISON fact sheet for P. m. epipleurotus

Plestiodon
Reptiles of Mexico
Fauna of the Western United States
Reptiles of the United States
Taxa named by Edward Hallowell (herpetologist)
Reptiles described in 1857